Kim Ju-na (born February 8, 1994) is a South Korean singer best known for participating in the talent show Produce 101 in 2016.

Personal life
Kim is the younger half-sister of South Korean actor Kim Soo-hyun.

Discography

Singles

Filmography

Television series

References

External links
 

1994 births
Living people
K-pop singers
South Korean women pop singers
South Korean female idols
South Korean contemporary R&B singers
Produce 101 contestants
21st-century South Korean singers
21st-century South Korean women singers